Springdale Mills, also known as Shank's Mill and Shockey Mills, is a historic grist mill located at Washington Township in Franklin County, Pennsylvania. It was built in 1857, and is a 3 1/-2-story, banked brick building with a fieldstone foundation.  A 24-foot diameter Fitz overshot wheel was installed between 1900 and 1910.

It was listed on the National Register of Historic Places in 1975.

References

External links
"Family wants to get Shank's Mill turning again," June 20, 2005, by Richard F. Belisle, herald-mail.com

Grinding mills on the National Register of Historic Places in Pennsylvania
Industrial buildings completed in 1857
Buildings and structures in Franklin County, Pennsylvania
Grinding mills in Pennsylvania
National Register of Historic Places in Franklin County, Pennsylvania
1857 establishments in Pennsylvania